The South East Corner is an interim Australian bioregion located in eastern Victoria and south-eastern New South Wales. The South East Corner bioregion is part of the Southeast Australia temperate forests ecoregion, and it also features the Lowland Grassy Woodland.

Subregions
The South East Corner bioregion consists of three subregions:

 East Gippsland Lowlands (SEC01) – 
 South East Coastal Ranges (SEC02) – 
 Bateman (SEC03) –

References

Biogeography of New South Wales
Biogeography of Victoria (Australia)
IBRA regions
Southeast Australia temperate forests